First Capital Bank Mozambique (FCBM), is a commercial bank in Mozambique,  that is licensed by the Bank of Mozambique, the central bank and national banking regulator.

FCBM is a subsidiary of FMBCapital Holdings Plc, a financial services conglomerate, based in Mauritius, whose shares of stock are listed on the Malawi Stock Exchange and has subsidiaries in Botswana, Malawi, Mozambique, Zambia and Zimbabwe.

Location
The headquarters of the bank and its main branch, are located at 
Avenue 25 de Setembro, Aterro do Maxaquene, Edifício Maryah, 7º Andar, Maputo, Mozambique. The geographical coordinates of the bank's headquarters are:25°58'37.0"S, 32°34'47.0"E (Latitude:-25.976944; Longitud:32.579722).

Overview
First Capital Bank Mozambique is a commercial bank that serves corporations, small and medium enterprises and individuals in Mozambique. As of 30 June 2019, the bank's total assets were MZN:4,316,793,808 (US$65.2 million), with shareholders' equity of MZN:870,972,962 (US$13.2 million). As of December 2018, the bank served over 16,000 customers at 4 branches, one service centre, 6 ATMs and employed 94 staff members.

History
The bank was established in 2010 as International Commercial Bank Mozambique. In 2013, First Merchant Bank of Malawi successfully acquired the subsidiaries of International Commercial Bank in Malawi, Mozambique and Zambia. Although the banking business of ICB Malawi was not viable, FMB was able to enter into the other two countries through the acquisition.

In December 2017, First Capital Bank Mozambique became a subsidiary of First Merchant Bank Capital Holdings Plc, of Mauritius, whose shares trade on the Malawi Stock Exchange (MSE), under the symbol: FMBCH

Ownership
FMBCapital Holdings Plc maintains an 80 percent shareholding in First Capital Bank Mozambique Limited.

Branches
The bank's headquarters are located at: Avenue 25 de Setembro, Aterro do Maxaquene, Edifício Maryah, 7º Andar, Maputo, Mozambique. The bank maintains brick-and-mortar branches as these locations:

 Nampula Branch: Rua Monomotapa Cruzamento, Avenue Paulo Samuel Kankhomba, Nampula 
 Machava Branch: Avenue das Indústrias, Number 513, Machava
 Main Branch: Rua Sociedade da Geografia, Number 269, Maputo
 24 de Julho Branch: Avenue 24 de Julho, Number 3549, Edifico do INSS, Maputo
 Corporate Branch: Rua Sociedade da Geografia, Number 269, Maputo.

Governance
Hitesh Anadkat is the chairman of the eight-person board of directors. João Rodrigues serves as the chief executive officer of the bank.

See also
 List of banks in Mozambique
 List of companies of Mozambique
 Economy of Mozambique

References

External links
 Official Website

Banks of Mozambique
Maputo
Banks established in 2010
2010 establishments in Mozambique
FMBCapital Holdings Plc